Ribosomal protein S6 kinase beta-1 (S6K1), also known as p70S6 kinase (p70S6K, p70-S6K), is an enzyme (specifically, a protein kinase) that in humans is encoded by the RPS6KB1 gene. It is a serine/threonine kinase that acts downstream of PIP3 and phosphoinositide-dependent kinase-1 in the PI3 kinase pathway. As the name suggests, its target substrate is the S6 ribosomal protein.  Phosphorylation of S6 induces protein synthesis at the ribosome.

The phosphorylation of p70S6K at threonine 389 has been used as a hallmark of activation by mTOR and correlated with autophagy inhibition in various situations. However, several recent studies suggest that the activity of p70S6K plays a more positive role in the increase of autophagy.

Function 

This gene encodes a member of the S6K family of serine/threonine kinases, which phosphorylate several residues of the S6 ribosomal protein. The kinase activity of this protein leads to an increase in protein synthesis and cell proliferation. Amplification of the region of DNA encoding this gene and overexpression of this kinase are seen in some breast cancer cell lines. Alternate translational start sites have been described and alternate transcriptional splice variants have been observed but have not been thoroughly characterized.

mTOR
The p70S6 kinase is a downstream target of mTOR (mammalian target of rapamycin) signaling, specifically mTORC1, an mTOR-containing complex characterized by the inclusion of Raptor rather than Rictor (mTORC2).  mTOR can be activated via an AND-gate-like mechanism at the lysosome, integrating signals about growth factors and bioavailability of important molecules. For instance, amino acids such as arginine and leucine can trigger lysosomal recruitment of mTORC1. Once at the lysosome, mTOR can be activated by Rheb, a small, lysosomal-resident GTPase, in its GTP-bound state. Rheb GTPase activity is stimulated (and therefore capacity to activate mTOR diminished) by the upstream TSC complex, which is inhibited by IGF signalling. Thus, the AND gate consists of proper localization by sufficiency of amino acids and activation by growth factors. Once mTOR has been properly localized and activated, it can phosphorylate downstream targets such as p70S6K, 4EBP, and ULK1 which are important for regulating protein anabolic/catabolic balance.

Physical exercise activates protein synthesis via phosphorylation (activation) of p70S6K in a pathway that is dependent on mTOR, specifically mTORC1.  This has been demonstrated by using an inhibitor of mTOR, rapamycin, to block an increase in muscle mass, despite increases in load (e.g., exercise).  Exercise has been shown to increase levels of IGF-1 in muscle, thus inducing the IGF-1/PI3K/Akt/p70S6K signaling pathway, and thereby increasing the protein synthesis is required to build muscle.

Clinical significance 

Inhibition of the S6K1 protein, or a lack of it, slows the production of adipose (fat) cells by disrupting and retarding the initial "commitment stage" of their formation. The study could have implications for the treatment of obesity.

Amplification of the region of DNA encoding this gene and overexpression of this kinase are seen in some breast cancer cell lines.

Another pathway for which P70 has proposed involvement is in muscle lengthening and growing. P70 is phosphorylated by passive stretch in the soleus muscle. This may be one of many protein kinases involved in muscle building.

In its inactive state, S6K1 is bound to eIF3 and detaches following phosphorylation by mTOR/Raptor. Free S6K1 is then able to phosphorylate a number of its targets, including eIF4B.

Interactions 

P70-S6 Kinase 1 has been shown to interact with:

 COASY, 
 CSNK2B, 
 EIF3B, 
 KIAA1303, 
 MTOR, 
 POLDIP3, 
 PPP2R2A, 
 RBX1, and
 UBC.

See also 
 Ribosomal S6 kinase
 RPS6KA1

References

External links 
 

Protein kinases
EC 2.7.11